Ptychadena taenioscelis is a species of frog in the family Ptychadenidae.
It is found in Angola, Botswana, Republic of the Congo, Democratic Republic of the Congo, Gabon, Kenya, Malawi, Mozambique, Namibia, South Africa, Tanzania, Zambia, possibly Burundi, possibly Uganda, and possibly Zimbabwe.
Its natural habitats are dry savanna, moist savanna, subtropical or tropical dry shrubland, subtropical or tropical moist shrubland, subtropical or tropical seasonally wet or flooded lowland grassland, swamps, intermittent freshwater marshes, pastureland, and canals and ditches.

References

Ptychadena
Taxa named by Raymond Laurent
Amphibians described in 1954
Taxonomy articles created by Polbot